Giant Rooks is a German indie rock band from Hamm, Germany founded in 2014. In 2019 they won the 1Live Krone Award and the Preis für Popkultur. Their debut album Rookery was released on 28 August 2020.

Members
 Frederik Rabe
 Finn Schwieters
 Luca Göttner
 Jonathan Wischniowski
 Finn Thomas

History

The band was founded in 2014 by the cousins Frederik Rabe and Finn Schwieters and the piano player Jonathan Wischniowski and was soon completed by the addition of bass player Luca Göttner and drummer Finn Thomas. In 2015 they released their first self-produced EP 'The Times Are Bursting The Lines'. This first release was followed by another EP New Estate in 2017, which gained them first critical success. The release was supported by hundreds of shows all over Europe eventually landing them a record deal with Irrsinn Tonträger (Universal Music). In 2019 the EP Wild Stare was released with its title track being a top 20 radio hit in Italy and the whole EP racking up more than 50,000,000 world-wide streams on Spotify soon after its release. In 2020 they announced the release of their debut album ROOKERY  for 28 August 2020. Radio X DJ John Kennedy played the band's single 'All We Are' on his X-Posure radio show, on the album's release.

On the Official Singles Chart Top 100 of 25 March 2022 to 31 March 2022, the band achieved their first UK hit when their version of Suzanne Vega's "Tom's Diner", with AnnenMayKantereit, charted at number 63.

Discography

Studio albums

Extended plays

Singles

As lead artist

As featuted artist

Promotional singles

References

External links 

 Giant Rooks
 Giant Rooks on YouTube

German indie rock groups
Musical groups established in 2014